Budoff is a surname. Notable people with the surname include:

Jeffrey Budoff (born 1965), American orthopedic surgeon
Penny Budoff (1939–2008), American writer

See also
Carrie Budoff Brown, American journalist and news editor